"It's Always Somethin'" is a song written by Aimee Mayo and Marv Green, and recorded by American country music artist Joe Diffie.  It was released in February 2000 as the third single from his album A Night to Remember.  It peaked at number 5 on the U.S. Billboard Hot Country Singles & Tracks chart and number 11 on the Canadian RPM Country Tracks chart.

Music video
The music video is a live performance, directed by Jon Small. It is the last music video of his career.

Chart positions
"It's Always Somethin'" debuted at number 66 on the U.S. Billboard Hot Country Singles & Tracks for the week of February 12, 2000.

Year-end charts

References

2000 singles
1999 songs
Joe Diffie songs
Songs written by Aimee Mayo
Song recordings produced by Don Cook
Songs written by Marv Green
Epic Records singles